Charles L. Moore Jr. (born October 3, 1966) is a retired United States Air Force lieutenant general who last served as deputy commander of the United States Cyber Command. He previously was the Deputy Director for Global Operations of the Joint Staff. In July 2020, the United States Senate confirmed his promotion to lieutenant general and nomination to become the deputy commander of the Cyber Command, replacing United States Navy Vice Admiral Ross A. Myers.

Awards and decorations

Effective dates of promotions

References 

Living people
Place of birth missing (living people)
United States Air Force generals
Major generals
Recipients of the Defense Superior Service Medal
Recipients of the Legion of Merit
1966 births